Juho Seppo Antero Eerola (born 24 February 1975 in Kymi, Finland) is a Finnish politician of the Finns Party. He was elected to the Finnish Parliament in the 2011 election. He is also a member of the city council of Kotka. In the True Finns' party conference of 2011 Eerola was elected as the party's second vice-chairman, and in the conference of 2013 he was elected as the third vice-chairman. Eerola is a former member of the nationalist organisation Suomen Sisu: he resigned his membership in 2012 when he felt that people outside the party were using the issue as a wedge against him and the party.

In 2011 the hacktivist group Anonymous leaked the membership applications of the Finnish Resistance Movement on Pastebin. It was revealed that Ulla Pyysalo, the aide of Juho Eerola, had applied for membership in the neo-nazi organization.

References

1975 births
Living people
People from Kotka
Finns Party politicians
Members of the Parliament of Finland (2011–15)
Members of the Parliament of Finland (2015–19)
Members of the Parliament of Finland (2019–23)